Mary Lou E. Van Dreel (née Ambrosius; born March 23, 1935) was a member of the Wisconsin State Assembly. She graduated from Nicolet High School in De Pere, Wisconsin, as well as the University of Wisconsin–Stevens Point and the University of Wisconsin–Oshkosh. Van Dreel is married with three children.

Career
Van Dreel was first elected to the Assembly in 1986. Additionally, she was a member of the Ashwaubenon Village Board from 1977 to 1987. She is a Democrat.

References

People from Glendale, Wisconsin
People from Ashwaubenon, Wisconsin
Women state legislators in Wisconsin
University of Wisconsin–Stevens Point alumni
University of Wisconsin–Oshkosh alumni
1935 births
Living people
Place of birth missing (living people)
Democratic Party members of the Wisconsin State Assembly